is a passenger railway station in located in the city of Tsu,  Mie Prefecture, Japan, operated by the private railway operator Kintetsu Railway.

Lines
Toyotsu-Ueno Station is served by the Nagoya Line, and is located 59.8 rail kilometers from the starting point of the line at Kintetsu Nagoya Station.

Station layout
The station was consists of two  island platforms, connected by a level crossing.

Platforms

Adjacent stations

History
Toyotsu-Ueno Station opened on May 8, 1944 as a station on Kansai Express Railway's Nagoya Line. This line was merged with the Nankai Electric Railway on June 1, 1944 to form Kintetsu.

Passenger statistics
In fiscal 2019, the station was used by an average of 672 passengers daily (boarding passengers only).

Surrounding area
Honjiroyama Youth Park (Ueno Castle Ruins)
former Kawage Town Hall
Kawage fishing port

See also
List of railway stations in Japan

References

External links

 Kintetsu: Toyotsu-Ueno Station

Railway stations in Japan opened in 1943
Railway stations in Mie Prefecture
Stations of Kintetsu Railway
Tsu, Mie